Market integration occurs when prices among different locations or related goods follow similar patterns over a long period of time. Groups of goods often move proportionally to each other and when this relation is very clear among different markets it is said that the markets are integrated. Thus, market integration is an indicator that explains how much different markets are related to each other. A marketer plays the role of an integrator in the sense that he collects feedback and vital inputs from other channel members and consumers and provides product solutions to customers by coordinating multiple functions of the organization.

Pricing